Dawn Road was a German Hard rock band playing neoclassicism, formed in February 1972. All four members of Dawn Road ended up playing in Scorpions, with Buchholz staying for 12 albums throughout their most commercially successful era, leaving the band in 1992 and later playing with among others Roth who had a successful solo career after leaving Scorpions in 1978.

The original and only line-up of Dawn Road features Uli Jon Roth (guitar, vocals), Jürgen Rosenthal (drums), Francis Buchholz (bass) and Achim Kirsching (keyboards, vocals). The band's repertoire consists mainly of their own compositions, written by Ulrich Roth and Achim Kirschng, recorded in demo versions without releasing an album or single. For a short period between 1972 and 1973, Rudolf Schenker and Klaus Meine of the Scorpions joined the group, before all four Dawn Road musicians joined the Scorpions in 1973, then only by Rudolf Schenker and Klaus Meine.

References

Citations 

German hard rock musical groups